Iya Traoré (born 1986) is a Guinean footballer and freestyler who has been featured in Guinness World Records three times. He is currently based in Paris where he features on TV shows, reality TV shows, music videos, and commercials.

Early and personal life
Traore started as a local goalkeeper in his village, Kebeya in Guinéa. After his dad returned from Europe, he decided to move out to study in Conakry, Guinéa, where he truly discovered his passion for football. In Conakry, he joined the football club Ibrahim FC and won many trophies with them.

Football career 
In 2000, Traore arrived in Paris, where he played for football clubs such as ESP, Paris FC, Paris Saint Germain (he was never offered a professional contract) and, at the same time, helped his father, an African art merchant.

Freestyle career

Traore has rebranded onto the global stage what freestyle has to be which gave him documentary opportunities and awards from across the Globe. He appeared in 2014 in Shakira's La La La Music" video for the World Cup in Brazil. He has performed in over 40 countries, including China, France, Ghana, Egypt, Morocco, Italy, the US, and Brazil.

References

Living people
1986 births
Guinean footballers
Association footballers not categorized by position